Mylenium Tour is Mylène Farmer's 1999-2000 concert tour in support of her fifth studio album, Innamoramento.

Critical reception and commercial success
According to the French magazine Instant-Mag, the "Mylenium Tour is more beautiful [than the 1996 tour] by the originality of the selection of songs, the grandiose stage, an entry even more impressive, and especially an overwhelming and perfect end, perhaps more comparable to that of the 1989 tour."

More than 450,000 people attended the concert series that cost more than 20 million euros.

A musical channel of the Russian television, MUZ TV, elected "Mylenium Tour" as the best concert at that year.

Set list
Introduction
 "Mylenium" (Opening)
 "L'Amour naissant"
Act I
 "L'Âme-stram-gram"
 "Beyond My Control" (replaced by "Que mon cœur lâche" in Russia)
 "Rêver"
 "Il n'y a pas d'ailleurs" (Not performed in Russia)
 "Mylène Is Calling (Interlude)"
Act II
  "Optimistique-moi"
 "Medley" ("Pourvu qu'elles soient douces" / "Libertine" / "Maman a tort" / "Sans contrefaçon")
 "Regrets"
 "Désenchantée"
Act III
 "Méfie-toi"
 "Dessine-moi un mouton"
 "California"
 "Pas le temps de vivre" (replaced by "Je t'aime mélancolie" in Russia)
Act IV
 "Je te rends ton amour"
 "Souviens-toi du jour"
Encore
 "Dernier Sourire"
 "Innamoramento"
 "Mylenium" (Closing)

Tour dates
There were a total of 43 shows, from September 21, 1999 to March 8, 2000, in four countries (France, Belgium, Switzerland, Russia):

Content

Credits and personnel

 Production: Tuxedo Tour
 Editions: Requiem Publishing
 Design entertainment: Mylène Farmer
 Set designer: Guy-Claude François
 Costumes designed by: Dominique Borg
 Make-up & hair: Pierre Vinuesa
 Lighting design: Fred Peveri
 Sound: Laurent Buisson
 Sound engineer: Thierry Rogen
 Production director: Paul Van Parys
 Musical direction: Yvan Cassar

 Musicians: Yvan Cassar, Eric Chevalier (keyboards), Jeff Dahlgren, Brian Ray (guitar), Jerry Watts Jr (bass), Abraham Laboriel Jr (drums)
 Choristers: Johana Manchec-Ferdinand, Esther Dobong' Na Essienne
 Choreography: Mylène Farmer ("L'Âme-Stram-Gram", "Optimistique-moi", "Désenchantée", "Souviens-toi du jour"); Christophe Danchaud ("Méfie-toi", "Dessine-moi un mouton") ; Mylène Farmer and Christophe Danchaud ("Pourvu qu'elles soient douces").
 Management: Thierry Suc
 Dancers: Christophe Danchaud, Valérie Bony, Augustin Madrid Ocampo Jr, Midori Anami, Lysander O. Abadia, Andrew Cheng, Richard Patten, Corey Smith
 Sponsors: NRJ, TF1, Coca-Cola
 Photos: Claude Gassian
 Design: Henry Neu / Com' N.B
 Tour Truck Drivers: Andy Barr, Davey Forbes, Mark Philips, Rob Bailey.

References

Further reading and press

 Julien Wagner, Jean-François Kowalski, Marianne Rosenstiehl, Claude Gassian, Mylène Farmer : Belle de scène (book on Farmer's tours), K&B Ed, 27 April 2007

1999 concert tours
2000 concert tours
Mylène Farmer concert tours

ru:Mylenium Tour (1999-2000)